1995 Kashiwa Reysol season

Review and events

League results summary

League results by round

Competitions

Domestic results

J.League

Emperor's Cup

Player statistics

 † player(s) joined the team after the opening of this season.

Transfers

In:

Out: no data

Transfers during the season

In
 Takashi Kojima (from Hyōgo FC)
 Kōichi Hashimoto (from Corinthians)
 Tomohiro Katanosaka (from Sanfrecce Hiroshima)
 Bentinho (on August)
 Wolnei Caio (on August)

Out
 Müller (on June)

Awards
none

References

Other pages
 J. League official site
 Kashiwa Reysol official site

Kashiwa Reysol
Kashiwa Reysol seasons